Better in Blak is the debut studio album by Australian singer-songwriter Thelma Plum, released on 7 July 2019 through Warner Music Australia.

Better in Blak achieved commercial success, peaking at number 4 on the ARIA Albums Chart, and winning two awards: Best Cover Art at the 2019 ARIA Music Awards and Album of the Year at the 2020 Queensland Music Awards.

An anniversary edition featuring previously unreleased tracks was released on 6 November 2020.

Critical reception

Better in Blak received critical acclaim.

Josh Leeson of The Newcastle Herald wrote: "Emotional, and unapologetically honest, the Indigenous artist addresses racism, sexism and her broken heart", adding, "Plum's voice is placed at the forefront of the mix, allowing the sparse indie-folk instrumentation to provide casual direction."

Al Newstead from Triple J wrote that Better in Blak is "an album of healing, [and] transforming the pain and sadness of a dark few years into a courageous, self-assured debut album."

Thomas Bleach described the album as "a collection of hard-hitting and thought invoking  moments", and "one of the most impressive debuts of the year". He also wrote that Better in Blak "embodies the different sides of her artistry in an honest and endearing way."

Awards and nominations

ARIA Music Awards

! 
|-
! scope="row" rowspan="5"| 2019
| rowspan="5"| Better in Blak
| Album of the Year
| 
| rowspan="5"| 
|-
| Best Cover Art
| 
|-
| Best Female Artist
| rowspan="3" 
|-
| Best Pop Release
|-
| Breakthrough Artist
|}

Australian Music Prize

! 
|-
! scope="row"| 2019
| Better in Blak
| Album of the Year
| 
| 
|}

J Awards

! 
|-
! scope="row"| 2019
| Better in Blak
| Australian Album of the Year
| 
| 
|}

National Indigenous Music Awards

! 
|-
! scope="row"| 2019
| Better in Blak
| Album of the Year
| 
| 
|}

Queensland Music Awards

! 
|-
! scope="row"| 2020
| Better in Blak
| Album of the Year
| 
| 
|}

Track listing

Charts

Weekly charts

Year-end charts

Release history

References

Notes

2019 debut albums
Thelma Plum albums
ARIA Award winners
Warner Music Australasia albums